Augusto Meyer (born in Porto Alegre on January 24, 1902; died in Rio de Janeiro on July 10, 1970) was a Brazilian poet, journalist, and folklorist. He won the Prêmio Machado de Assis in 1948.

Works

As a poet 
 A ilusão querida (1923)
 Coração verde (1926)
 Giraluz (1928)
 Duas orações (1928)
 Poemas de Bilu (1929)
 Sorriso interior (1930)
 Literatura & poesia, poema em prosa (1931)
 Poesias 1922-1955 (1957)
 Antologia poética (1966)

As a crític and essayist 
 Machado de Assis (1935)
 Prosa dos pagos(1943)
 À sombra da estante (1947)
 Le Bateau ivre. Análise e interpretação (1955)
 Preto & Branco (1956)
 Gaúcho, história de uma palavra (1957)
 Camões, o bruxo e outros estudos (1958)
 A chave e a máscara (1964)
 A forma secreta (1965)

As a folklorist 
Guia do folclore gaúcho (1951)
Cancioneiro gaúcho (1952)
Seleta em prosa e verso (1973)

As a memorialist 
 Segredos da infância (1949)
 No tempo da flor (1966)

20th-century Brazilian poets
Brazilian male poets
1902 births
1970 deaths
Brazilian people of German descent
People from Rio Grande do Sul
Members of the Brazilian Academy of Letters
20th-century Brazilian male writers